Marcusiola is a genus of worms belonging to the family Hofsteniidae.

Species:
 Marcusiola tinga (Du Bois-Reymond Marcus, 1957)

References

Acoelomorphs